The Lords of Underearth is a 1981 board game published by Metagaming Concepts as part of its MicroGame line.

Gameplay
The Lords of Underearth is a game of subterranean warfare - orcs vs dwarves vs humans vs monsters - in an underground labyrinth.

Reception
William A. Barton reviewed The Lords of Underearth in The Space Gamer No. 38. Barton commented that "The Lords of Underearth [...] qualifies as a game to be recommended to novice fantasy gamers and aficionados of The Fantasy Trip role-playing system. Fantasy veterans might find it an interesting diversion from their more complex endeavors as well."

Eric Goldberg reviewed The Lords of Underearth in Ares Magazine #10 and commented that "Lords demonstrates that small fantasy boardgames can be the result of quality work. The emphasis is on the simple and the playable, but never on the simplistic."

In a retrospective review of The Lords of Underearth in Black Gate, John O'Neill said "This is a fully featured game that offers a range of solitaire and 2-player scenarios deep in the heart of an ancient Dwarven fortress… all in 14 pages of rules and a box that can fit in your pocket. It's well worth a look."

References

Board games introduced in 1981
Metagaming Concepts games